Romford Garden Suburb (otherwise known as the Gidea Park Exhibition Estate), is a late-Edwardian housing development in Gidea Park, in the London Borough of Havering. The object of the new suburb, which was built on land belonging to Gidea Hall, then occupied by the Liberal politician Herbert Raphael, was, according to his parliamentary colleague John Burns, to "provide families with a well-built, modern home regardless of class or status" and "to bring the towns into the country and the country into the towns".

The garden suburb was conceived to be an example of early 20th-century domestic architecture and town planning. They were popular in Edwardian England; Hampstead Garden Suburb, established by Henrietta Barnett in 1906, was one example. The garden suburb at Romford comprised 159 fully-furnished houses and cottages each funded by the architects who designed them, in either the Arts and Crafts or Art Nouveau styles. Upon completion an exhibition was organised to showcase the dwellings for prospective buyers and a competition was held to find the best building, with a first prize of £250 and a gold medal being awarded to the winning architect. The best detached houses were awarded Class I status, which would allow the property to be sold for £500, while Class II buildings were marketed for £375. The buildings were judged on their utility and economy of management and maintenance. 
 
One hundred architects and urban planners took part in the Gidea Park development, including William Curtis Green, Philip Tilden, Raymond Unwin, Richard Barry Parker, George Val Myer, Geoffry Lucas and Baillie Scott. The exhibition opened in the spring of 1911 and with it came the establishment of several roads, including Balgores Lane, Squirrels Heath Avenue and Crossways to the south of Hare Street (now Main Road) and Heath Drive, Meadway, Reed Pond Walk, Heaton Grange Road, Risebridge Road and Parkway to the north. In 1934, using land left over from the first competition, a second exhibition was held, this time hosted by Raphael's nephew, Major Ralph Raphael MC. These houses were designed in the Art Deco style, a taste that was dominant at the time. Six of the 1911 exhibition houses were later designated as Grade II listed buildings by Historic England. The suburb was designated as a conservation area in 1970. The winner of the 1934 competition, 64 Heath Drive, by Francis Skinner, a founding member of Berthold Lubetkin's Tecton Group, was also listed at Grade II in 1997.

History

Thomas Cooke, a Yorkshireman who became London Mayor in 1462, was granted a Royal Charter for Havering-atte-Bower. This enabled him to build a country house, which he named "Geddy Hall". The word "geddy" derived from the lake and its livestock; ged, meaning pike, and ea (water). The house remained unfinished for at least a century because of his numerous incarcerations within the Tower of London for High Treason. Upon his death in 1478, the estate was passed down through the Cooke family and eventually to his great-grandson, Anthony Cooke, tutor for Edward VI, in October 1579.

After a brief period abroad, Anthony returned to Havering-atte-Bower and completed the building of Geddy Hall, which became Gidea Hall. In 1657, the hall and its grounds were sold to Richard Emes, a local businessman, for £9,000. Upon the Restoration in 1660, the estate was bought back by the Crown and passed through the ownerships of various nobilities; it was eventually sold through public auction, before the Coronation of Queen Victoria. Gidea Hall sold to the Black family in 1802 under whose ownership it remained until 1883 when it was bought for redevelopment by a company that was associated with Jabez Balfour. The company was unsuccessful in its plans and in 1893, Gidea Hall was again put up for sale.

The English landscape designer Humphry Repton designed a small hamlet in Gidea Park and lived there in the early 1800s in a small cottage, out of which he worked, adjacent to Balgores Lane at the junction of, what was then, Hare Street. The cottage survived until the 1960s when it was demolished to make way for a bank.

Planning

The Liberal Member of parliament, Herbert Raphael, purchased Gidea Hall, Romford, in 1897. It came set within  and Raphael purchased a further , which he divided up, giving , which included a lake, for use as a public park; Raphael lent his name to it in 1904. He formed the idea for a garden suburb after the construction of Hampstead Garden Suburb, which was established by Henrietta Barnett in 1906 on land purchased from Eton College. Barnett had set up the Hampstead Garden Suburb Trust Ltd and appointed Barry Parker and Raymond Unwin as its chief architects. Raphael decided to capitalise on the success seen at Hampstead and other garden suburbs, such as at Ealing, Tottenham and Tooting, and set about organising an his own exhibition at Gidea Park.

Raphael enlisted the help of John Tudor Walters, an architect and surveyor, and Charles McCurdy, who had been a director for the Hampstead Garden Suburb Trust, to set up the Gidea Hall Development Company, the head office for which was based at 33 Henrietta Street, in Covent Garden, London. Raphael designated  to the building of the garden suburb, on the west side of the Gidea Hall estate; to the east,  was used to establish a golf course. Each acre within the suburb area was to contain no more than six dwellings.

House and Cottage Exhibition Committee
 
For the suburb layout, the judges handled 323 plans from architects all over the country who wished to take part. First prize and £100 was awarded to W. Garnett Gibson and Reginald Dann. For the dwellings, they received 2000 applications from interested architects, with 100 being selected by the judges, Guy Dawber, H. V. Lanchester, and Mervyn Macartney. The object of the new suburb, according to the Liberal Member of parliament John Burns, who was then the president of the Local Government Board, was "to provide families with a well-built, modern home, regardless of class or status", and "to bring the towns into the country, and the country into the towns".  Raphael's plan was to give the working classes a chance to enjoy a new home on land that had previously been occupied and enjoyed only by the "few in splendid isolation".

President
Sir John Burns
Honorary secretary
Michael Bunney

Vice-presidents

Archbishop of Canterbury
Archbishop of Westminster
Robert Crewe-Milnes, 1st Marquess of Crewe
Francis Greville, 5th Earl of Warwick (Lord Lieutenant of Essex)
Daisy Greville, Countess of Warwick
The Bishop of London
The Bishop of St Albans
John Lubbock, 1st Baron Avebury
George Curzon, 1st Marquess Curzon of Kedleston
John William Strutt, 3rd Baron Rayleigh
Maurice Towneley-O'Hagan, 3rd Baron O'Hagan
Lord Claude Hamilton
Sir Edward Clarke
Sir Alganon West 
Walter Long, 1st Viscount Long
Amelius Lockwood, 1st Baron Lambourne
Sir William Chance
Sir James Fortescue Flannery
Sir Hiram Maxim 
Sir Edward Poynter
Sir Herbert H. Raphael 
Sir Frederick Treves, 1st Baronet
Sir Lawrence Alma-Tadema
Robert Baden-Powell, 1st Baron Baden-Powell
John Bethell, 1st Baron Bethell
Sir David Bruce
Sir George Gibb
Sir Oliver Lodge
John Simon, 1st Viscount Simon
Sir Aston Webb
Charles Wyndham, 3rd Baron Leconfield
Henry Scott Holland
Edward Lyttelton
Alfred Austin
Arnold Bennett
A. C. Benson
George Cadbury
Hall Caine
Walter Crane
Theodore Andrea Cook
Alfred Hoare Powell
Henry Arthur Jones
Arthur Keen 
Benjamin Kidd
Alfred Marshall

Note: For a complete list, see the source for the House and Cottage Exhibition Committee The Book of the Exhibition of Houses and Cottages, Romford Garden Suburb, Gidea Park, pp. 8–9.

Design and construction

 
Building for the new suburb started in 1909 when Raphael commissioned the construction of a new railway station which he intended to assist with accessibility for prospective buyers at the Exhibition. The station was to be served by the Great Eastern Main Line. The foundation stone was laid on the first dwelling on 28 July 1910. by Burns, The stone, part of the front elevation of 16 Heath Drive, is now only visible from inside the garage at the address.

By the late spring of 1911 the project was complete, and featured 140, fully furnished houses and small cottages, in the Arts and Crafts style. The entire development cost £60,000 with a further £20,000 being put aside for the building of roads, pavements and street furniture. The landscaping was carried out by William Barron & Son, Ltd.

To visualise what each house would look like, Raphael took inspiration from Henrik Ibsen's The Master Builder, which used the motto "Houses for people to live in" and from Francis Bacon's The Essayes Or Covnsels, Civill and Morall, of Francis Lo. Vervlam, Viscovnt St. Alban, which carried the phrase "A house is to live in, not to look at". Bacon's link to Gidea Park - his grandfather, Sir Anthony Cooke, occupied Gidea Hall in the 16th century - was used to advertise the new suburb. The Book of the Exhibition of Houses and Cottages: Romford Garden Suburb, Gidea Park was written to accompany the Exhibition and to detail each building for the benefit of prospective buyers. A number of important people were asked for their opinion on what made the perfect house and how modern day living could be improved, including Thomas Hardy, Sir Edward Poynter, Millicent Fawcett and Arnold Bennett.

The interiors were designed to make domestic living as economic as possible. There was much tiling throughout, especially in the kitchen and scullery, where surfaces could be cleaned easily. Some of the dwellings were furnished by the architect, and others by leading companies of the day, including Heal & Son who were based in Tottenham Court Road. The construction of each house was either funded solely by the architect or in partnership with the builder.

Competition
Upon completion, a competition was held in the summer of 1911 to find the best building, an event that was witnessed by Raphael, Walters, McCurdy, and Sir Frederick Treves, among others. A first prize of £250 and a gold medal was awarded to the winning architect and builder. The judges, Guy Dawber, Henry Vaughan Lanchester and Mervyn Macartney, gave the best detached houses a Class I status, which would allow the property to be sold for £500. The best detached cottages were given a Class II status which allowed them to be marketed for £375. Smaller prizes were given for best internal decoration, best town plan, best garden design, drawings, and excellence in craftsmanship and construction. Admission to the public, and prospective buyers, was free. A sales office was opened at 75 Main Road, opposite Balgores Lane, in 1913 to cope with purchase enquiries and viewings. The building was thought by Nikolaus Pevsner to have been originally built for the Japan–British Exhibition in White City, but was relocated to its current site. Balgores House, which was built in the 1850s, since renamed to Gidea Park College, served as the exhibitions refreshments room.

Categories, prizes and winners

Judges 

Charles Allom
Walter Cave
Guy Dawber
Henry Vaughan Lanchester
Halsey Ricardo
Charles McCurdy
Eden Phillpotts
E. G. Pretyman
J. W. Robertson Scott
Leonard Stokes
John Strachey
Tudor Walters
H.G. Wells
Thomas McKinnon Wood
Lawrence Weaver

Note: For a complete list, see the source for the House and Cottage Exhibition Committee The Book of the Exhibition of Houses and Cottages, Romford Garden Suburb, Gidea Park, pp. 8–9.

Architects and buildings

A request was made by the committee in the building press for architects to take part in the exhibition which would give them the chance to showcase their talents. The response was good with 100 architects signing up, with some completing several houses on the development.  Of the notable architects, William Curtis Green, who had established his office just ten years previously, designed two properties, as did Baillie Scott, who was long established. Others included Robert van 't Hoff, Philip Tilden, Norman Jewson, and Raymond Unwin and Richard Barry Parker, who were both instrumental in the design of the garden suburb at Hampstead.

Of the 140 dwellings that were built, six were designated as Grade II listed buildings by Historic England. On 14 September 1979, 16 and 27 Meadway; 36 and 38, Reed Pond Walk; and 43, Heath Drive, were added to the national register of protected buildings. 41 Heath Drive was added on 30 June 2000.

Purchasing
The first plot sold in July 1910, soon after the exhibition opened; on another plot, the first house was being built, at a cost of £850. By the following year, 153 plots had been sold and £63,000 had already been invested in house building. Interested buyers were offered a special deal on the plots in the summer of 1911 by the Gidea Hall Development Company. The deal would include complete funding of the plot and dwelling in exchange for a £5 upfront payment followed by monthly or quarterly payments over a 7-year period. The purchaser could either choose the plot to invest in, or live in the house themselves. Each plot was sold for £100 with the promise of the land being worth a lot more by the time the instalment term had expired.

The directors of the Gidea Hall Development Company agreed to pay the conveyancing costs, including the tax, and a Deed of Conveyance certificate was given to the purchaser on completion. Building on the plots was not a requirement; advice was given that the space could be used for plantation, until such a time when the purchaser wished to build a dwelling.  Funding for a house was also offered by the company, in exchange for monthly payments over a 10, 15, or 20-year term. The offer included a 4% discount that would be applied to each purchase and should the purchaser die during the contract, all monies would be paid back to the deceased's estate.

Gidea Park Modern Homes Exhibition

A second competition, separate from the first, was held in Romford Garden Suburb between 31 July and 20 August 1934 and was called the Gidea Park Modern Homes Exhibition. It was the idea of Raphael's nephew, Major Ralph Raphael MC, who shared his uncle's 1911 vision; to build affordable, economical housing which benefited from the concept of rational design by competing architects. 35 houses were built and each were marketed from between £650 and £1,475.

The exhibition was opened by the Earl of Crawford and was visited by the Prince of Wales. It ran for 18 days but failed to achieve the kind of success that the 1911 exhibition did. The competition was won by Francis Skinner, then aged 26, who had been articled to Berthold Lubetkin two years previously and who was a founding member of Lubetkin's Tecton Group. The dwelling, 64 Heath Drive, was built at a cost of £900 and was one of Tecton's first designs.

The suburb was made a conservation area by the local government in June 1970. On 24 March 1997, 64 Heath Drive was designated as a Grade II listed building by English Heritage.

Notes and references
Notes

References

Sources

Housing in England
Garden suburbs
Arts and Crafts architecture in London
London Borough of Havering
Grade II listed houses in London
Architectural competitions
1911 in London
Conservation areas in England